Ján Novota (born 29 November 1983) is a retired Slovak football goalkeeper and a football coach.

A member of the Hungarian minority in Slovakia, Novota made his national team debut against Montenegro on 23 May 2014 (2–0 win), playing the second half of the friendly fixture. Later he was fielded in 3 additional friendly games against Iceland, Georgia and Austria, which was his last international cap on 15 November 2016. The only game he played for entire 90 minutes was against Iceland.

Novota was forced to retire from professional football on 5 February 2018 after suffering from aortic aneurysm, which caused his aorta to reach some 1.3 times the normal. His last competitive game was for Debrecen on 9 December 2017 in Round 19 of Nemzeti Bajnokság I against Diósgyőri.

In 2021, Slovak journalist of Hugnarian ethnicity Titanilla Bőd published a biography of Novota titled by his surname.

In December 2022, he led a mid-season training camp in Senec for Slovak national team prospects under Francesco Calzona as the goalkeeper's coach, in place of his former national team partner Matúš Kozáčik. In March 2023, ahead of the first two UEFA Euro 2024 qualifiers, it was announced that Novota will replace Kozáčik as the goalkeeping coach of the national team permanently.

References

External links
Profile at fcdac1904.com 

1983 births
Living people
Slovak footballers
Slovak people of Hungarian descent
Slovak expatriate footballers
Association football goalkeepers
FC Senec players
FC DAC 1904 Dunajská Streda players
SK Rapid Wien players
Austrian Football Bundesliga players
Panserraikos F.C. players
Debreceni VSC players
Slovak Super Liga players
Nemzeti Bajnokság I players
People from Galanta District
Sportspeople from the Trnava Region
Expatriate footballers in Greece
Expatriate footballers in Austria
Expatriate footballers in Hungary
Slovak expatriate sportspeople in Greece
Slovak expatriate sportspeople in Austria
Slovak expatriate sportspeople in Hungary
UEFA Euro 2016 players
Slovakia international footballers